Nosy Be  (formerly Nossi-bé and Nosse Be) is an island off the northwest coast of Madagascar. Nosy Be is Madagascar's largest and busiest tourist resort.

Nosy Be means "big island" in the Malagasy language. The island was called Assada during the early colonial era of the 17th century. Nosy Be has been given several nicknames over the centuries, including "Nosy Manitra" (the scented island).

History
The first human inhabitants of Nosy Be were small bands of Antankarana and Zafinofotsy, before the Sakalava people migrated there and became the most numerous ethnic group on the island. These people were joined later by some Comorians, Indians or Antandroy. Nosy Be made first major appearance in Madagascar's history when King Radama I announced that he intended to conquer the whole west of Madagascar. That plan was eventually achieved in 1837 when the Sakalava Kingdom of Boina came into the possession of Ranavalona I upon the defeat of Queen Tsiomeko's army.

The French colonized the island from 1840, founding an outpost named Hell-Ville (from French Admiral de Hell). The 1848 abolition of slavery in the French colonies resulted in a revolt against the French by the Sakalava people, who were extensively involved in the slave trade. In the late 19th and early 20th centuries, the island was governed by the French as an internal protectorate within the colony of Madagascar. The outpost became an important trade harbor in the Mozambique channel. During the nineteenth century, the French settlers developed cash crop agriculture (mainly sugar cane) and recruited indentured laborers from East Africa. Though it was difficult for the French to control the littoral, they founded a plantation colony in Nosy Be, mainly producing sugar and cash crops. The French used both military force and diplomacy to maintain their position in the island, appointing the former ruler of Nosy Be Binao as the gouverneur principal of the island.

During the Russo-Japanese War Nosy Be became a supply station for Russia's Second Pacific Squadron. The main fleet led by Admiral Zinovy Rozhestvensky reached Nosy Be on January 9, 1905, where it met a smaller detachment led by Admiral Dmitry von Fölkersam that had arrived already on December 28, 1904. The fleet stayed for two months for refurbishing and coaling, leaving on March 17 to meet its fate ten weeks later at the Battle of Tsushima.

Lynching of tourists, 2013
The island, like most of Madagascar, suffers from an extreme level of uncertainty linked to crime and violence. Rumours quickly turn into accusations in Madagascar, and lynchings are common, even for allegations related to traffic accidents or theft. On October 3, 2013, the body of an 8-year-old boy was discovered at the beach of Ambatoloaka on the island. The condition of the body was poor after one week in the water, and a rumour was spread that the child had been murdered by Western organ-trafficking tourists. The uncle of the boy, a local named Zaidou, was detained by the local police for questioning, but a violent mob gathered to storm the local jail to punish the supposed murderer.

As the uncle was not found, the anger of the mob turned to the Westerners having been in contact with the person, French tourists Sébastien Judalet and Roberto Gianfalla. Judalet was found and dragged from his hotel to the beach of Ambatoloaka, where the large mob repeatedly hit him with sticks and stones. The police received at least five calls from bystanders or expatriates but did not respond. Two police officers actually joined the mob, one of which who was filming the lynching on his smartphone. After three hours of torture and humiliation, the naked and bleeding tourists were put into car tires and thrown alive into a bonfire on the beach. On the afternoon of October 3, 2013, the uncle Zaidou was found driving on the island. A mob of several hundred quickly lynched him by burning him alive on a public street next to a mosque.

Both events were filmed by the bystanders, publishing the murders on the internet. In spite of this mass of evidence, the local justice took two years of investigation to finally convict 4 members of the mob to lifetime imprisonment and 6 others to shorter sentences; 26 suspects in custody were released without charge as well as the two police officers.  A local politician, Joseph Yoland, was accused of inciting the killings on his radio station at the island, but the charges were dropped when the court allegedly was unable to retrieve any recordings of the aired shows that evening. Following the events, the French authorities warned travellers for "high risk of assaults, that could be extremely violent", U.S. travellers are also advised "[to] be aware of the potential for mob violence and ‘popular justice’ that is sometimes directed towards foreign nationals.".  The lynching in Nosy Be is a rare public murder of expatriates in Madagascar; most lynchings concern locals. However, expatriates are frequently subject to kidnapping and extortion, such as the January 2015 kidnapping of a 12-year old French child outside of his school, and two separate kidnappings of French citizens of Indo-Pakistani origin in April 2016 that triggered the intervention of the French police tactical unit GIGN in Madagascar.

Geography

Nosy Be is located about eight kilometers from the coast of Madagascar in the Mozambique Channel; several smaller islands are located nearby, including Nosy Komba, Nosy Mitsio, Nosy Sakatia, and Nosy Tanikely. The island's main town is Andoany.

There are eleven volcanic crater lakes on the island.

The island is known for having one of the world's smallest frogs (Stumpffia pygmaea) and chameleon (Brookesia minima). The Lokobe Reserve is one of Madagascar's five Strict Nature Reserves (Réserves Naturelles Intégrales). Nosy Be is also home to a specific color of panther chameleon (Furcifer pardalis).

Omura's whale

Recent studies indicate that adjacent waters around the channel between Nosy Be and Madagascar host a habitat for notable number of Omura's whale, and this has allowed researchers to conduct field studies targeting this rare species for the first time.

Climate
Nosy Be has a tropical monsoon climate. It is most humid in summer (December, January, February). The Tsaratanana massif partially protects the island from the strong north-east winds affecting the region in August or during tropical depressions. The wet season lasts from October until the beginning of May, followed by a relatively short dry season that lasts through September. As characteristic of its climate however, it still sees moderate amounts of precipitation even during this time. Daytime temperatures remain fairly steady throughout the year, hovering around 30 °C (86 °F), while the nights are slightly cooler during the dry season.

Administration 
The island constitutes a department within Diana Region and is organized as the City of Nosy Be (Commune Urbaine de Nosy Be). Its mayor is Mr. Vita Zarga.

Economy
Once a major location of plantation of sugar cane and production of its derived products  (sugar, rum), the island's main activities are now the plantation of ylang-ylang (for the production of essential oils) and tourism. Nosy Be is the most developed tourism destination in Madagascar. This is the only place in Madagascar where all-inclusive large resorts can be found.

Transportation
The island is served by Fascene Airport. The airport is serviced by commercial flights with Air Madagascar, Air Austral, Ewa, Ethiopian Airlines, and has direct flights from Europe on Neos. Its main city and harbour, Hell-Ville, can be reached by boat from Ankify.

Education

French international schools:
 École primaire française Lamartine

Local public schools:
 EPP Andavakotoko
 EPP Galliéni
 EPP boulevard Manceaut (?)
 CEG Ambalakatakata
 Lycée mixte of Nosy Be

Twin towns—sister cities

Nosy Be is twinned with:
 Naples, Italy

See also
List of volcanoes in Madagascar

References

External links

Cities in Madagascar
Islands of Madagascar
Volcanoes of Madagascar
Populated places in Diana Region
Holocene volcanoes
Districts of Diana Region